is a video game for the Nintendo DS game based on the Dinosaur King TV series.

Plot
The game's story is about Max, Rex, and Zoe, the members of the D-Team (of whom only Max and Rex are available as player characters). One day, they find mysterious stones that allow them to summon dinosaurs, after creating special cards from fossils, using a special device called a Dinoshot. However, an evil group called the Alpha Gang steals a Dinoshot in order to create a dinosaur empire. It is the D-Team's job to stop the Alpha Gang.

Gameplay
The gameplay is much like that of the Pokémon game series. Players collect dinosaurs by excavating and then cleaning fossils. Fossils are cleaned using a pick. However, the pick will only last a short time before it breaks. In addition to this, a perfectly clean fossil will produce a higher leveled dinosaur than one that is not, making it important for players to carefully use the pick.

Battles take place as random encounters on the overworld map. Each side has a maximum of three dinosaurs which they can send out. The battle system is based on the game of rock, paper, and scissors-winning allows the dinosaur to attack, losing allows the opponent dinosaur to attack, and a tie inflicts neutral damage to either side. Several of the moves in the game become more powerful according to wins or losses, or they allow attacks on a tie.

Dinosaurs become stronger as they gain levels through experience. At certain levels, they generate move cards, which can be attached to dinosaurs as the player desires. Moves vary in function from dealing damage, inflicting status effects, summoning other creatures to assist the dinosaur, or changing the battlefield itself to power up a specific type.

Dinosaurs in the game are categorised according to elemental types, which include specific types of dinosaurs. Each type also has a strength and a weakness against another type. There are 72 dinosaurs available normally in the game, not including Secret type dinosaurs or dinosaurs which can only be obtained through entering a special code at a specific place in the game.

Reception

The game received "mixed" reviews according to the review aggregation website Metacritic. IGN journalist Mark Bozon embraced the game's gameplay that he found nostalgic and its 3D animations, while dismissing the sound effects and bland 2D overworld.

References

External links
 

2007 video games
Nintendo DS games
Nintendo DS-only games
Dinosaurs in video games
Role-playing video games
Video games based on anime and manga
Video games developed in Japan